Az-Zawayda, also spelled Zawaida, is a Palestinian town in Deir al-Balah Governorate located about three kilometers northeast of the city of Deir al-Balah and just west of Maghazi refugee camp. According to the Palestinian Central Bureau of Statistics (PCBS) 2006 estimate, there were 15,483 residents.

References

Deir al-Balah Governorate
Cities in the Gaza Strip
Municipalities of the State of Palestine